The 152nd Division() was created on November 1948  under the Regulation of the Redesignations of All Organizations and Units of the Army, issued by Central Military Commission on November 1, 1948, basing on the 7th Independent Division of the Northeastern Field Army, formed in January 1948.

The division was a part of PLA 39th Corps, under which command it took part in the Chinese civil war.

In August 1952 the division was re-organized as 1st Forestry Engineering Division((), moving to Hainan for rubber plantation. In October the division was demobilized and became Hainan States Farms, now one of the biggest rubber production enterprise in the world.

As of its re-organization the division was composed of:
454th Regiment;
455th Regiment;
456th Regiment.

References

中国人民解放军各步兵师沿革，http://blog.sina.com.cn/s/blog_a3f74a990101cp1q.html
海南农垦总局，https://web.archive.org/web/20160920082132/http://www.hifarms.gov.cn/page_xz.php?xuh=71373

Infantry divisions of the People's Liberation Army
Military units and formations established in 1948
Military units and formations disestablished in 1952